Hayez is a surname. Notable people with the surname include:
Francesco Hayez, (1791–1882), Italian painter
Théo Hayez (born 2001), Belgian man who disappeared in the Cape Byron area

French-language surnames
Surnames of French origin
Surnames of Belgian origin